Sho Is Funky Down Here is the 31st studio album by American musician James Brown, released in 1971 on King Records, his last album on the label after having been on the label since 1956. It was #26 on the Billboard R&B Albums chart and #137 on The Billboard 200 in 1971.

An entirely instrumental album, it's full of heavy fuzzed-out guitars in a jazzy psychedelic rock style, resembling the first records by Funkadelic. All songs are by James Brown and David Matthews and the record is somewhat a second album by Matthews' Grodeck Whipperjenny group. David Matthews worked as the band leader for James Brown at the time.

Track listing
All tracks composed by James Brown and David Matthews

Personnel
James Brown - organ, harpsichord, vocals
Michael Moore - bass
Jimmy Madison - drums
Kenny Poole - guitar
David Matthews - organ

References

James Brown albums
1971 albums
Albums arranged by David Matthews (keyboardist)
Albums produced by James Brown
King Records (United States) albums